Heart of the Rockies  is a 1951 American Western film directed by William Witney and starring Roy Rogers and Penny Edwards. The Rockies are not shown in the film.

Plot
Mr. Willard is facing the State building a highway across his cattle land with the labor performed by young offenders spared a term in prison by working on a road gang. Willard's corrupt ranch foreman Devery is using the opportunity to rustle Willard's purebred cattle and replace them with inferior stock. Devery and Willard see their only chance to save the ranch is by creating a series of crimes starting on a dude ranch that the blame on the young prisoners. Highway engineer Roy Rogers tries to stop them but his only ally is Willard's fair-minded daughter June.

Cast
 Roy Rogers as Roy Rogers
 Trigger as Trigger, Roy's Horse
 Bullet as Bullet, Roy's dog
 Penny Edwards as June Willard
 Gordon Jones as "Splinters" McGonigle
 Ralph Morgan as Andrew Willard 
 Fred Graham as Devery 
 Mira McKinney as Mrs. Edsel 
 Robert 'Buzz' Henry as Dave Braddock 
 William Gould as Warden Parker
 Pepe Hern as Rocky 
 Rand Brooks as Jim Corley 
 Foy Willing as Foy (as Foy Willing and the Riders of the Purple Sage) 
 Riders of the Purple Sage as Cowhands / Musicians (as Foy Willing and the Riders of the Purple Sage)

External links
 

1951 films
1951 Western (genre) films
American Western (genre) films
American black-and-white films
Films directed by William Witney
1950s English-language films
1950s American films